Huzheng succeeded his father Tute Ruoshi Zhujiu as chanyu of the Xiongnu in 178 AD. He was killed by the Han Emissary Zhang Xiu in 179 AD. The title of chanyu passed to the Western Tuqi Prince Qiangqu.

Footnotes

References

Bichurin N.Ya., "Collection of information on peoples in Central Asia in ancient times", vol. 1, Sankt Petersburg, 1851, reprint Moscow-Leningrad, 1950

Taskin B.S., "Materials on Sünnu history", Science, Moscow, 1968, p. 31 (In Russian)

Chanyus